Kwaku Adu Yeboah is a Ghanaian Politician and a member of the Third Parliament of the Fourth Republic representing the Agona East constituency in the Central Region of Ghana.

Early life and education 
Yeboah was born in Agona East, a town in the Central Region of Ghana. He studied at the University of Cape Coast.

Politics 
Kwaku Yeboah was first elected into Parliament on the ticket of the National Democratic Congress during the 2000 Ghanaian general election. He polled 10,989 votes out of the 23,936 votes valid votes cast, representing 45.9%. His opponents were John Agyabeng of the National Patriotic Party (NPP), Kofi Anane Adjei of the National Reform Party (NRP), Joseph Kodjo Duodu of the Convention People's Party (CPP) and Isaiah Kwame Asante of the People's National Convention (PNC). They had 44.60%, 7.60%, 1.10% and 0.80% of the total votes cast respectively. Kwaku took over from Kojo Yankah in 2000.   He was defeated by John Agyabeng in the 2004 Ghanaian Parliamentary election.

Career 
Adu is a former member of Parliament for the Agona East Constituency in the Central Region of Ghana.

References 

University of Cape Coast alumni
Ghanaian MPs 2001–2005
Living people
Year of birth missing (living people)
National Democratic Congress (Ghana) politicians
People from Central Region (Ghana)